Invicta, Latin for undefeated or unconquered, is the motto of the English county of Kent, appearing on the coat of arms of Kent County Council. It is also used in the names of several Kent based organisations or other entities:

Radio
 Invicta Sound, Invicta Radio and Invicta FM, all former names/brands of the Independent Local Radio station which covered the county from 1984, being renamed/branded in 2009 as Heart Kent
 Radio Invicta, a former name of KING Radio which became Radio 390, a former 1960s/1970s pirate radio station which broadcast from a former British Army Maunsell Fort off the coast of Whitstable
 Radio Invicta (London Pirate Station), a former 1960s pirate radio station which had a Kent postal address, but broadcast across London from various tower blocks

Schools
 Invicta Grammar School, a girls' grammar school in Maidstone
 Invicta Primary School in Blackheath, London, formerly part of Kent

Youth Organisations
 Invicta Scout Group, based in Chislehurst. 
Sports
 Invicta Kent Autograss Club, a member of the National Autograss Sport Association, organizing grass track motor racing at Ivychurch, Romney Marsh
 Invicta Dynamos, the men's ice hockey team in Gillingham
 Invicta Dynamics, the women's ice hockey team in Gillingham
 Folkestone Invicta F.C., a football club based in Folkestone
 Invicta Water Polo, a National League team based in the county
 Kent Invicta RLFC, a defunct English rugby league team
 Kent Invicta Football League, an amateur football league in Kent
Invicta Cricket Coaching, a cricket coaching company based in Kent

Transport
 Invictaway, a brand name for the London commuter coach operations of Maidstone & District Motor Services, a former operator whose local bus operations covered much of West Kent bounded roughly by the Medway Towns, Tunbridge Wells, and Ashford
 Invicta International Airlines, a charter airline which operated from Manston Airport in Thanet, from 1965 to 1982

Other
 Swanley Invicta 305, a branch of The Loyal Order of Moose in Great Britain, a fraternal and service organisation, who meet in Swanley
 Kent Invicta Chamber of Commerce,  chamber of commerce covering Kent and Medway.

See also
 Invicta Ground, a former football stadium in Plumstead (south east London, formerly part of Kent), home of Arsenal F.C. from 1890 to 1893
 Flag of Kent, sometimes referred to as the Invicta Flag
 White horse of Kent, a symbol closely associated with Kent, sometimes referred to as Invicta